Hongxing District is a district of the city of Yichun, Heilongjiang province, People's Republic of China.

Notes and references 

Hongxing